Regular element may refer to:
 In ring theory, a nonzero element of a ring that is neither a left nor a right zero divisor 
 In ring theory, a von Neumann regular element of a ring
 A regular element of a Lie algebra or Lie group